Disappearing Britain was a three-part TV mini-series broadcast on the Five channel in Britain. The series contained rare archive film of Thatcher-era Britain, with a retrospective commentary, and interviews with the general public.

Three shows were broadcast:
"Tea" Wendy Craig explored the changing British relationship with tea

"When Coal Was King" Ricky Tomlinson reported on the decline of British coal mining

"Beside the Seaside" Sarah Lancashire investigated the changing nature of summer holidays

Controversy
Disappearing Britain caused controversy in the second episode when the narrator, Ricky Tomlinson, made comments about Margaret Thatcher going to hell and how he would celebrate her death with coal miners: "When Thatcher dies she won't need coal, because where she's going she'll be bloody roasting! The Miners with all have a celebration, and I'll be having a pint with them when it happens!"

References

External links 
 

2006 British television series debuts
2006 British television series endings
2000s British documentary television series
2000s British television miniseries
Channel 5 (British TV channel) original programming
English-language television shows